Placental site trophoblastic tumor is a form of gestational trophoblastic disease, which is thought to arise from intermediate trophoblast.

The tumor may secrete human placental lactogen, and result in a false-positive pregnancy test.

A placental site trophoblastic tumor is a monophasic neoplasm of the implantation site intermediate trophoblast, and usually a benign lesion, which comprises less than 2% of all gestational trophoblastic proliferations. Preceding conditions include molar pregnancy (5%). Compared to choriocarcinoma or invasive mole, hemorrhage is less conspicuous and serum β-HCG level is low, making early diagnosis difficult.

Immunohistochemistry: Often stains with hPL, keratin, Mel-CAM, EGFR.

Treatment
Because chemotherapy is ineffective; the patient should undergo hysterectomy.

Prognosis
10–20% of cases metastasize leading to death.

References

External links 

Health issues in pregnancy
Germ cell neoplasia